The absence of good, also known as the privation theory of evil, is a theological and philosophical doctrine that evil, unlike good, is insubstantial, so that thinking of it as an entity is misleading. Instead, evil is rather the absence, or lack ("privation"), of good. This also means that everything that exists is good, insofar as it exists; and is also sometimes stated as that evil ought to be regarded as nothing, or as something non-existent.

It is often associated with a version of the problem of evil: if some things in the world were to be admitted to be evil, this could be taken to reflect badly on the creator of the world, who would then be difficult to admit to be completely good. The merit of the doctrine in serving as a response to this version of the problem of evil is disputed.

History

Ancient Greek and Hellenistic philosophy 
The doctrine is sometimes said to be rooted in Plato. While Plato never directly stated the doctrine, it was developed, based on his remarks on evil, by the Neoplatonist philosopher Plotinus, chiefly in the eighth tractate of his First Ennead. The following quotation from that tractate, in which evil is described as non-being, illustrates this:As these are real beings, and as the first Principle is their superior, evil could not exist in such beings, and still less in Him, who is superior to them; for all these things are good. Evil then must be located in non-being, and must, so to speak, be its form, referring to the things that mingle with it, or have some community with it. This "non-being," however, is not absolute non-being. Its difference from being resembles the difference between being and movement or rest; but only as its image, or something still more distant from reality. Within this non-being are comprised all sense-objects, and all their passive modifications; or, evil may be something still more inferior, like their accident or principle, or one of the things that contribute to its constitution. To gain some conception of evil it may be represented by the contrast between measure and incommensurability; between indetermination and its goal; between lack of form and the creating principle of form; between lack and self-sufficiency; as the perpetual unlimited and changeableness; as passivity, insatiableness, and absolute poverty. Those are not the mere accidents of evil, but its very essence; all of that can be discovered when any part of evil is examined. The other objects, when they participate in the evil and resemble it, become evil without however being absolute Evil.

Ancient and medieval Christian thought 
Neoplatonism was influential on St. Augustine of Hippo, with whom the doctrine is most associated. Augustine, in his Enchiridion, wrote:

Also, in his City of God, he wrote: 

Through the influence of Augustine, this doctrine influenced much of Catholic thought on the subject of evil. For instance, Boethius famously proved, in Book III of his Consolation of Philosophy, that "evil is nothing". The theologian Pseudo-Dionysius the Areopagite also states that all being is good, in Chapter 4 of his work The Divine Names. Thomas Aquinas concluded, in article 1 of question 5 of the First Part of his Summa Theologiae, that "goodness and being are really the same, and differ only in idea".

Early modern philosophy 
The philosopher Baruch Spinoza also agreed with the doctrine, when he said: "By reality and perfection I mean the same thing" (Ethics, part II, definition VI). He clarified this definition in the preface to part IV of the same work:Perfection and imperfection, then, are in reality merely modes of thinking, or notions which we form from a comparison among one another of individuals of the same species; hence I said above (II. Def. vi.), that by reality and perfection I mean the same thing. For we are wont to refer all the individual things in nature to one genus, which is called the highest genus, namely, to the category of Being, whereto absolutely all individuals in nature belong. Thus, in so far as we refer the individuals in nature to this category, and comparing them one with another, find that some possess more of being or reality than others, we, to this extent, say that some are more perfect than others. [...]

As for the terms good and bad, they indicate no positive quality in things regarded in themselves, but are merely modes of thinking, or notions which we form from the comparison of things one with another. Thus one and the same thing can be at the same time good, bad, and indifferent. For instance, music is good for him that is melancholy, bad for him that mourns; for him that is deaf, it is neither good nor bad. Nevertheless, though this be so, the terms should still be retained. For, inasmuch as we desire to form an idea of man as a type of human nature which we may hold in view, it will be useful for us to retain the terms in question, in the sense I have indicated.Leibniz adhered to the doctrine as well, and employed it as part of his theodical argument that the actual world is the best of all possible worlds.

Late modern religion 
The doctrine is also held by the Baháʼí Faith. ʻAbdu'l-Bahá stated to a French Baháʼí woman:

Criticism

Bertrand Russell criticized the doctrine in his essay The Elements of Ethics:

Sorrow 
Pain and sorrow, mentioned by Russell in the quote above, are popular alleged counterexamples. The Stanford Encyclopedia of Philosophy article on "The Concept of Evil", written by philosopher Todd Calder, also says that "it seems that we cannot equate the evil of pain with the privation of pleasure or some other feeling. Pain is a distinct phenomenological experience which is positively bad and not merely not good."

Thomas Aquinas, a proponent of the privation theory, argued against this opinion in his Summa Theologiae:[...] supposing the presence of something saddening or painful, it is a sign of goodness if a man is in sorrow or pain on account of this present evil. For if he were not to be in sorrow or pain, this could only be either because he feels it not, or because he does not reckon it as something unbecoming, both of which are manifest evils. Consequently it is a condition of goodness, that, supposing an evil to be present, sorrow or pain should ensue.

Opposition between appearances 
Immanuel Kant believed that, while the doctrine is true of concepts of the understanding, it is nevertheless false about the world as it appears to the senses. In a remark to the section of the Critique of Pure Reason entitled the "Amphiboly of the Conceptions of Reflection", he criticized the Leibnizian school of philosophy for not acknowledging this possibility of merely phenomenal opposition:The principle: "Realities (as simple affirmations) never logically contradict each other," is a proposition perfectly true respecting the relation of conceptions, but, whether as regards nature, or things in themselves (of which we have not the slightest conception), is without any the least meaning. For real opposition, in which A − B is = 0, exists everywhere, an opposition, that is, in which one reality united with another in the same subject annihilates the effects of the other—a fact which is constantly brought before our eyes by the different antagonistic actions and operations in nature, which, nevertheless, as depending on real forces, must be called realitates phaenomena. General mechanics can even present us with the empirical condition of this opposition in an à priori rule, as it directs its attention to the opposition in the direction of forces—a condition of which the transcendental conception of reality can tell us nothing. Although M. Leibnitz did not announce this proposition with precisely the pomp of a new principle, he yet employed it for the establishment of new propositions, and his followers introduced it into their Leibnitzio-Wolfian system of philosophy. According to this principle, for example, all evils are but consequences of the limited nature of created beings, that is, negations, because these are the only opposite of reality. (In the mere conception of a thing in general this is really the case, but not in things as phenomena.) In like manner, the upholders of this system deem it not only possible, but natural also, to connect and unite all reality in one being, because they acknowledge no other sort of opposition than that of contradiction (by which the conception itself of a thing is annihilated), and find themselves unable to conceive an opposition of reciprocal destruction, so to speak, in which one real cause destroys the effect of another, and the conditions of whose representation we meet with only in sensibility.

References

Good and evil
Metaphysics of religion
Systematic theology
Bahá'í belief and doctrine